France Jamet (born 1961) is a French politician and a member of National Rally.

She is an FN regional councillor in the Languedoc-Roussillon region, elected in 2004 on a list led by her father, Alain Jamet. In 2009 she was selected to be National Front's candidate in the Languedoc-Roussillon region for the 2010 regional elections.

She unsuccessfully contested Hérault's 1st constituency at the Legislative elections in 2017 and 2022.

References

External links

1961 births
Living people
MEPs for South-West France 2014–2019
MEPs for France 2019–2024
National Rally (France) MEPs
21st-century French women politicians
Candidates for the 2022 French legislative election